North End Historic District is a national historic district located at Newport News, Virginia. It encompasses 451 contributing buildings in a primarily residential section of Newport News.  It is a compact, middle-class and upper middle-class residential neighborhood that arose during the period 1900–1935 in association with the nearby Newport News Shipbuilding and Dry Dock Company. The neighborhood includes notable examples of the Victorian, Colonial Revival, and Bungalow styles. Notable buildings include the Walter A. Post House (1902), John Livesay House (1906), J. E. Warren House (1905), W. L. Shumate House (1915), and Willet House (c. 1930).

It was listed on the National Register of Historic Places in 1986.

References

Historic districts on the National Register of Historic Places in Virginia
Victorian architecture in Virginia
Colonial Revival architecture in Virginia
Buildings and structures in Newport News, Virginia
National Register of Historic Places in Newport News, Virginia